Path Head Mill is an 18th-century water mill situated in Summerhill, Blaydon, Tyne and Wear, England where the Vale Mill Trust has been restoring the site to include a water mill, a joiner's water power workshop and visitor's centre since 1994/95.

References

External links
Path Head Mill website

Tourist attractions in Tyne and Wear
Watermills in England
Museums in Tyne and Wear
Mill museums in England